Private First Class Michael J. Perkins (1899 – October 28, 1918) was a soldier in the United States Army who received the Medal of Honor posthumously for his actions during World War I.

Biography

Perkins was born in South Boston, Massachusetts in 1899, and joined the Army in 1916. Despite being wounded in the action cited in his Medal of Honor citation, he was killed by an artillery shell the next day while being transported to the infirmary. He is buried in New Calvary Cemetery, Mattapan, Massachusetts. An elementary school is named after him surrounding the old colony housing development in South Boston Massachusetts.

Medal of Honor citation
Rank and organization: Private First Class, U.S. Army, Company D, 101st Infantry, 26th Division. Place and date: At Belieu Bois, France, 27 October 1918. Entered service at: Boston, Mass. Birth: South Boston, Mass. G.O. No.: 34, W.D. 1919.

Citation:

He, voluntarily and alone, crawled to a German "pill box" machinegun emplacement, from which grenades were being thrown at his platoon. Awaiting his opportunity, when the door was again opened and another grenade thrown, he threw a bomb inside, bursting the door open, and then, drawing his trench knife, rushed into the emplacement. In a hand-to-hand struggle he killed or wounded several of the occupants and captured about 25 prisoners, at the same time silencing 7 machineguns.

See also

List of Medal of Honor recipients
List of Medal of Honor recipients for World War I

References

External links

United States Army Medal of Honor recipients
United States Army soldiers
American military personnel killed in World War I
People from Boston
1899 births
1918 deaths
World War I recipients of the Medal of Honor
United States Army personnel of World War I
Military personnel from Massachusetts
Burials in Massachusetts